Michael Yaw Gyato is a Ghanaian politician and member of the Seventh Parliament of the Fourth Republic of Ghana representing the Krachi East Constituency in the Volta Region on the ticket of the New Patriotic Party.

Early life and education 
Michael Gyato was born on April 2, 1970 in Dambai, in the Volta Region. He acquired his HND from Accra Polytechnic and Master's from the Ghana Institute of Management.

References

Ghanaian MPs 2017–2021
1970 births
Living people
New Patriotic Party politicians